The Inquirer is a leading independent daily newspaper published in Liberia, based in Monrovia. It is privately owned with a "good reputation". A former notable editor is Gabriel I. H. Williams, secretary general and president of the Press Union of Liberia (PUL).

See also
 List of newspapers in Liberia

References

External links

Newspapers published in Liberia
Mass media in Monrovia